Ibuki is a Japanese surname. Notable people with the surname include:

, Japanese politician
, Japanese actor

Fictional characters:
, from the anime series Clannad 
, from Clannad
 from the anime Neon Genesis Evangelion
, from Touhou Project
, from the anime Beyblade Burst.

Ibuki (written: ,  or ) is also a unisex Japanese given name. Notable people with the name include:

, Japanese footballer
, Japanese footballer
, Japanese footballer
, Japanese voice actress
, Japanese sailor
, Japanese footballer 
, Japanese weightlifter
, Japanese footballer 

Fictional characters:

, a fictional character from Asu no Yoichi!
, a character from Danganronpa 2: Goodbye Despair
, a character from Street Fighter
, a character from Beastars
, a character from the anime and game D4DJ.

Japanese-language surnames
Japanese unisex given names